The 2017 ASUN Conference men's soccer season was the 40th season of men's varsity soccer in the conference. The regular season began on August 25, 2017 and ended on October 28, 2017. The regular season culminated with the 2017 ASUN Men's Soccer Tournament, which was held from November 3–11, 2017. The tournament determined the conference's tournament champion, and automatic berth into the 2017 NCAA Division I Men's Soccer Tournament.

Newly appointed head coach, Kyle Gookins lead the Stetson Hatters to their first Atlantic Sun regular season championship, accumulating a 4-0-2 record. The Hatters edged out traditional ASUN power Florida Gulf Coast for the title. In the tournament, Lipscomb earned their first ASUN championship, and thus, their first berth into the NCAA Tournament. There, they lost in the first round to Butler.

Background 

Ahead of the 2017 season, there were two head coaching changes. Jesse Cormier, formerly Vermont's head coach, took the head coaching role at Florida Gulf Coast. This came following Bob Butehorn's departure from FGCU, to coach South Florida. Kyle Gookins, formerly an assistant coach for Charlotte, took the head coaching position at Stetson. This was following Jared Vock stepping down as the caretaker manager for Stetson.

Head coaches

Preseason

Recruiting

Preseason poll 

The preseason poll had Florida Gulf Coast winning the regular season, just ahead of North Florida and Lipscomb.

Regular season

Results

Rankings

United Soccer Coaches National

Postseason

A-Sun Tournament

NCAA Tournament

Awards

Regular season awards

Postseason awards

All-ASun awards and teams 

ASUN First Team

ASUN Second-Team

All-Americans 
No players from the ASUN Conference earned All-American honors.

MLS SuperDraft

Total picks by school

List of selections

Homegrown contracts 

No ASUN players signed homegrown contracts with their parent MLS club.

See also 
 2017 NCAA Division I men's soccer season
 2017 Atlantic Sun Conference women's soccer season

References 

 
2017 NCAA Division I men's soccer season